Jason Hunter may refer to:

Inspectah Deck (Jason Hunter, born 1970), American musician
Brother J (Jason Hunter), member of the hip hop group X Clan
Jason Hunter (American football) (born 1983), American football player